Christian Lerche (23 April 1917 – 9 June 2008) was a Norwegian physician and civil servant.

He was born in Kristiania to Jacob Lerche Johansen and Wibecke Christiane Fredrikke Nicolaysen, and was a great-grandson of Jochum Johansen. He was married to Adèle Elisabeth Pihl Stranger from 1946, a daughter of Rolf Stranger.

Lerche was director of the Norwegian Institute of Public Health from 1957 to 1984. He was decorated Knight, First Class of the Order of St. Olav in 1979.

References

1917 births
2008 deaths
Physicians from Oslo
Norwegian public health doctors
University of Oslo alumni